Antonio Buzzolla (2 March 1815 – 20 March 1871) was an Italian composer and conductor. A native of Adria, he studied in Venice, and later worked with Gaetano Donizetti and Saverio Mercadante. He composed five operas, but was better known in his lifetime for ariettas and canzonettas in the Venetian dialect. Buzzolla was one of the composers invited by Giuseppe Verdi to contribute to the Messa per Rossini; he composed the opening movement, the Requiem e Kyrie. He died in Venice in 1871.

Compositions

Sacred Works 

 Messa a quattro parti e piena orchestra
 Requiem a quattro
 Requiem aeternam e Kyrie della Messa per Rossini (1871 al Teatro La Fenice di Venezia con Teresa Stolz ed Achille De Bassini)
 Miserere, a tre voci
 many works for Cappella Marciana not published.

Piano Music 
 Sonata [n. 1] in mi bemolle maggiore, Op. 1
 Sonata n. 2 in sol maggiore
 Marziale in do maggiore
 Notturno in fa minore
 Due valzer

Operas 
 Ferramondo (Venezia, Teatro San Benedetto, 3 December 1836)
 Mastino I° della Scala (Venezia, Gran Teatro La Fenice, 31 May 1841)
 Gli Avventurieri (Venezia, Gran Teatro La Fenice, 14 May 1842)
 Amleto (Venezia, Gran Teatro La Fenice, 24 February 1848)
 Elisabetta di Valois (Venezia, Gran Teatro La Fenice, 16 February 1850)
 La puta onorata, (in Venetian dialect, after Carlo Goldoni) unfinished

Songs 

 Serate a Rialto, a una voce con accompagnamento di pianoforte
 Il gondoliere, raccolta di dodici ariette veneziane
 I giardinieri, duetto in veneziano
 La campana del tramonto
 La desolada
 La farfala
 Un baso in falo
 Un ziro in gondola
 Mi e ti
 El fresco
 El canto
 Cantata funebre dei caduti di Solferino e S. Martino

References
Biography from Answers.com

External links
 

1815 births
1871 deaths
19th-century classical composers
19th-century Italian composers
19th-century conductors (music)
Cappella Marciana composers
Cappella Marciana maestri
Italian classical composers
Italian male classical composers
Italian opera composers
Italian conductors (music)
Italian male conductors (music)
Male opera composers
People from the Province of Rovigo
Culture in Venice